The 1955 Wilkes 160 was a NASCAR Grand National Series event that was held on October 23, 1955, at the North Wilkesboro Speedway in North Wilkesboro, North Carolina.

Summary
One hundred and sixty laps were competed on a dirt oval track spanning . There were three cautions delivered down by NASCAR officials and the race lasted exactly one hour, twenty-one minutes, and sixteen seconds. Buck Baker defeated Lee Petty by a time of three seconds. Ford would make its first Grand National Series win at this speedway; making it a viable competitor against Dodge, Chevrolet and Chrysler. Ten thousand people attended this autumn race. This race would produce Joe Weatherly's first finish in the top five. Most of the drivers in this racing event were driver-owners who owned their own racing vehicle and drove their vehicle directly to the races instead of towing it from hundreds of miles away.

All the drivers in this event were racing for a prize purse that totalled $4,285 ($ when adjusted for inflation). Only 20 of the 28 competing drivers would gain financially from this race; with individual earnings that ranged from $1,110 ($ when adjusted for inflation) to a paltry $50 for the NASCAR drivers who finished in 13th place through 20th place ($ when adjusted for inflation). No financial compensation was given to the participants who finished in the bottom 9 due to NASCAR's limited budget for prize winnings in an era prior to "big money" sponsors like Sprint Nextel and the R.J. Reynolds Tobacco Company.

Carl Kiekhaefer was one of the notable crew chiefs on attendance for this race; he helped to service Tim Flock's racing vehicle.

Qualifying

Results

† signifies that the driver is known to be deceased

Race summary
 Lead changes: 0
 Cautions: 3 
 Red flags: N/A
 Time of race: 1:21:16 
 Average speed: 72.347
 Margin of Victory: 5 seconds

Timeline
Section reference:
 Start of race: Buck Baker started the race with the pole position.
 Lap 25: Ted Cannady's steering became problematic, sealing his last-place finish in the race.
 Lap 28: Tom Pistone's vehicle overheated, forcing him to exit the race prematurely.
 Lap 35: The bumper on Junior Johnson's vehicle fell off, damaging his vehicle and forcing him to exit the race prematurely.
 Lap 40: Banks Simpson's radiator went berserk; Joe Eubanks' steering stopped working properly.
 Lap 50: Marvin Panch's vehicle overheated while he was racing.
 Lap 70: Ned Jarrett's fuel pump became problematic while he was driving the vehicle.
 Lap 90: Herb Thomas had a terminal crash, forcing him to retire from the race.
 Lap 103: The RF hub on Curtis Turner developed problems.
 Lap 127: Ralph Liguori's vehicle stalled on the track; Bill Blair had some problems with his RF hub.
 Lap 128: A wheel came off of John McVitty's vehicle, forcing him out of the race.
 Finish: Buck Baker was officially declared the winner of the event.

References

Wilkes 160
Wilkes 160
NASCAR races at North Wilkesboro Speedway